Changamwe Constituency is an electoral constituency in Changamwe, Kenya. It used to be one of the four constituencies in Mombasa district. With the promulgation of the new constitution in August 2010, it saw a creation of two more constituencies in Mombasa County. These are Jomvu and Nyali Constituencies which were curved out from Changamwe and Kisauni Constituencies respectively thereby bringing a total of six constituencies in 2012.

Before the curving out of Jomvu constituency from Changamwe, the constituency used to have eight wards electing Councillors for the Mombasa municipal council.

Promulgation of New Constitution 

With the promulgation of the new constitution in August 2010, the districts were renamed to Counties thus bringing a total of 47 counties in the country and the wards renamed to county assembly wards. This also saw the remapping of Changamwe Constituency boundary by the Independent Electoral and Boundaries Commission - IEBC as mandated by the New Constitution.

Changamwe Constituency has five county assembly wards namely: Airport; Chaani; Kipevu; Miritini and Port Reitz

High Court Ruling 

Following the petitions made by the Changamwe constituents against the manner in which IEBC handled the delimitation of the constituency, the High Court ruled in favor of the people on 9 July 2012. In the ruling carried out by the 5 High court sitting judges, they ordered IEBC to rename Magongo ward as Changamwe ward and move it to Changamwe Constituency; at the same time the IEBC was ordered to move Miritini ward to Jomvu Constituency.

Changamwe now has the following county assembly wards: Changamwe ward, Chaani ward, Airport ward, Kipevu ward and Port Reitz ward.

Historical Perspective 

Members of Parliament

Locations and wards

References

External links 

	

Constituencies in Coast Province
Constituencies in Mombasa County